Christopher Guy (born January 25, 1973) is an American professional wrestler, better known by his ring name Ace Steel. He is perhaps best known for his time with Ring of Honor and occasional appearances for World Wrestling Entertainment, as well as his stint in WWE's Ohio Valley Wrestling developmental territory and a short run in All Elite Wrestling as a backstage producer.

Professional wrestling career

Early career (1991–2002)
Guy became interested in professional wrestling after watching American Wrestling Association shows at the International Amphitheatre as a child. He debuted in October 1991 after training with Windy City Pro Wrestling.

Steel eventually formed a tag team with Danny Dominion first known as the L.A. Connection in Windy City Wrestling then the Hollywood Hardbodies. Along with Dominion, Steel worked as both wrestlers and trainers for St. Paul Championship Wrestling, an independent promotion and professional wrestling school, from 1998 to 2001 until the promotion was renamed to Steel Domain Wrestling. During this time, Steel held the promotion's Television Championship, and became the last man to hold it under the SPCW banner and the first under the SDW banner.

Steel worked for Independent Wrestling Association Mid-South. On February 8, 2002, he defeated Kurt Krueger for the promotion's Light Heavyweight Championship. Steel held the title until March 8, when he lost it to Vic Capri. Steel would eventually reclaim the title on May 3 after defeating Capri in a thirty-minute Iron Man match, but was stripped of the title in June when he failed to defend it within the thirty-day limit.

NWA Total Nonstop Action (2002–2003) 

Steel was signed by NWA Total Nonstop Action soon after the promotion opened in May 2002. He wrestled a tag team match with his former student, CM Punk, as the Hatebreed and received a small push as part of the X Division, but was used irregularly, working a handful of dates before his contract expired in October 2003.

Ring of Honor (2003)
In early 2003, Steel joined Ring of Honor and reformed the Hatebreed with CM Punk. On March 22, Punk and Steel faced Punk's enemy Raven and another student of Steel's, Colt Cabana, in a tag match. Cabana appeared to badly injure himself after botching a moonsault to the outside of the ring, forcing Raven to wrestle the majority of the match single-handedly. Raven eventually managed to defeat Steel following an Even Flow DDT, but after the match, Cabana turned on him and aligned himself with Steel and Punk. Punk, Cabana and Steel named themselves the Second City Saints, in reference to all three stable members being from Chicago.

The Second City Saints started a feud with The Prophecy, mostly B. J. Whitmer and Dan Maff. The rivalry led to a Chicago Street Fight. The match had many dangerous spots including a Spear through a barbed wire board, a splash from inside the ring to the outside onto Maff on a ladder supported by the guardrails, and a kneeling reverse piledriver off the top rope through a table.

World League Wrestling (2003–2005)
Steel joined Harley Race's World League Wrestling promotion in 2003, and in November and December 2003 he represented WLW on a tour with Pro Wrestling Noah in Japan. Steel enjoyed working in Japan and began appearing regularly with Noah.  The Gold Exchange (Matt Murphy and Superstar Steve) were the reigning Tag Team Champions, and, when Superstar Steve was injured, Steel took his place as Murphy's partner and helped defend the Tag Team Titles until Steve returned and reclaimed his half of the championships. After Murphy left the promotion, Steel became Steve's partner, and on May 7, 2005 in Ozark, Missouri Steel and Steve defeated Wade Chism and Dakota for the Tag Team Championship. In 2014, Steel returned to win the WLW Heavyweight Championship and lost it later that year.

Pro Wrestling Noah (2003-2006)
Ace Steel participated in tours to Pro Wrestling Noah wrestling the company’s owner Mitsuharu Misawa in many tag team matches as well as company legends Kenta Kobashi, Akira Taue and many others during his time there. Legendary wrestler Harley Race was Steel’s agent for wrestling tours. In 2005, Steel challenged for the GHC Light heavyweight championship vs Kenta in Steamboat Rock, Iowa for World League Wrestling with Noah officials and Harley Race present. Steel has a tattoo on his arm in memory of Misawa. CM Punk and Rancid guitarist Lars Frederiksen have the same tattoo as a collaborative tribute.

World Wrestling Entertainment (2004–2007)

Steel appeared with World Wrestling Entertainment on the September 27, 2004 episode of Raw and had his hair cut by Eugene, who would face Eric Bischoff in a hair versus hair match at the upcoming Taboo Tuesday pay-per-view. Steel used the name "Scott Colton" (the real name of Colt Cabana) as an inside joke. After Eugene inexpertly cut his hair, Bischoff ambushed Eugene and Steel, knocking them out with thrust kicks. Cabana returned the favor on the April 10, 2006 episode of Raw when he wrestled under the name Chris Guy, Steel's real name.

Steel also made an appearance on Velocity on April 1, 2006 against Orlando Jordan, as well as various dark matches and TV appearances from July 2000.

On the January 8, 2007 episode of Raw, Steel portrayed Donald Trump, in an intergender match with Kiley McLean, dubbed "The Donald vs. Rosie". "Trump" received the win after throwing Fudgie the Whale at Rosie's face and pinning her after a second turnbuckle "hairbutt". It was reported on January 18, 2007, in the midst of 11 releases on that day, that he officially signed a WWE developmental contract. Steel debuted in Deep South Wrestling in February. When Deep South Wrestling shut down on April 19, 2007 Steel was moved to Ohio Valley Wrestling where he was added to the roster. He debuted in September 2007.

Steel wrestled on the October 5, 2007 edition of SmackDown!, quickly losing to Chuck Palumbo. Ace was later released from his WWE developmental contract on February 4, 2008 along with five other developmental wrestlers.

Return to ROH (2008–2009)
On December 5, 2008, Steel returned to Ring of Honor at their Wrestling at the Gateway event. He teamed with Necro Butcher to defeat the team of Jimmy Jacobs and Delirious. His next match was a 10-man cage match at ROH's Caged Collision event on January 31, 2009. He also appeared at Take No Prisoners, losing to Colt Cabana.

Return to WWE (2019–2022)
It was announced that Steel was signed to WWE as a coach in November 2019. He was furloughed on April 15, 2020 as a part of cutbacks due to the COVID-19 pandemic. He returned on October 16 of that year. On January 5, 2022, Steel was released by WWE.

All Elite Wrestling (2022)
During the post-show conference for Revolution, All Elite Wrestling owner Tony Khan announced that Ace was working with AEW in a backstage capacity. On the August 31, 2022 episode of AEW Dynamite, Steel made an appearance with an on-camera hype promo to encourage CM Punk to sign the open contract for a rematch with Jon Moxley at All Out for the AEW World Championship. Steel would appear in a pre-match entrance segment with Punk at the event.

During the All Out post-event media scrum, CM Punk made several comments insulting Kenny Omega and The Young Bucks, among others. This led to a backstage fight between Punk, Steel, Omega, and the Young Bucks. The Bucks and Omega were reported to have forcefully entered Punk’s locker room in a heated frenzy. As a result of an unofficial investigation, Steel was released by AEW on October 18, 2022. Reportedly, Steel entered the room with concerns that his injured wife was in danger.

References

External links 
 
 

1973 births
20th-century professional wrestlers
21st-century professional wrestlers
American male professional wrestlers
Living people
People from Chicago
Professional wrestling trainers
Professional wrestlers from Illinois